The 1852 United States presidential election in Virginia took place on November 2, 1852, as part of the 1852 United States presidential election. Voters chose 15 representatives, or electors to the Electoral College, who voted for President and Vice President.

Virginia voted for the Democratic candidate, former U.S. Senator Franklin Pierce over the Whig candidate, military lieutenant general Winfield Scott. Pierce won the state by a margin of 11.42%.

Results

References

Virginia
1852
1852 Virginia elections